Nicholas Shaback (September 10, 1918 – January 5, 2010) was an American professional basketball player. He played for the Cleveland Rebels in the Basketball Association of America during the 1946–47 season. He was a 5'11" (1.80 m), 180 pounds (82 kg) guard. He attended James Monroe High School in The Bronx, New York.

BAA career statistics

Regular season

Playoffs

References

NBA.com : Nicholas (Nick) Shaback Info Page

External links

1918 births
2010 deaths
Basketball players from New York (state)
Cleveland Rebels players
Point guards
Wilkes-Barre Barons players
American men's basketball players
James Monroe High School (New York City) alumni